Leo Carroll may refer to:
 Leo Carroll (American football) (born 1944), former American football defensive end 
 Leo Carroll (volleyball) (born 1983), volleyball player from Canada
 Leo G. Carroll (1886–1972), English actor